The discography of Scottish band Deacon Blue consists of ten studio albums, two live albums, seven compilation albums, and one album that is both a studio and a compilation album.

Albums

Studio albums

Footnotes

Part studio part compilation albums

Live albums

Compilation albums

Extended plays

 1990 Four Bacharach & David Songs

Singles

Videography

Videos
1990: The Big Picture (1989 Concert)
2006: The Bigger Picture (1989 Concert plus Music Videos up to 2006)
2008: Live (2007 Edinburgh Concert)
2017: Live at the Glasgow Barrowlands (included three music videos from the Believers album)

Music videos
 1987: "Dignity" [Version 1]
 1987: "Loaded"
 1987: "When Will You (Make My Telephone Ring)"
 1988: "Dignity" [Version 2]
 1988: "Dignity" [Version 3]
 1988: "Chocolate Girl"
 1988: "Real Gone Kid" [Version 1]
 1988: "Dignity" [Version 4]
 1988: "Real Gone Kid" [Version 2]
 1989: "Wages Day"
 1989: "Fergus Sings the Blues"
 1989: "Love and Regret"
 1989: "Queen of the New Year"
 1990: "I'll Never Fall in Love Again"
 1991: "Your Swaying Arms"
 1991: "A Brighter Star Than You Will Shine"
 1991: "Twist and Shout"
 1991: "Closing Time"
 1991: "Cover from the Sky"
 1992: "Your Town"
 1993: "Will We Be Lovers"
 1993: "Only Tender Love"
 1993: "Hang Your Head"
 1994: "I Was Right and You Were Wrong"
 1999: "Love Hurts"
 2001: "Everytime You Sleep"
 2006: "Bigger Than Dynamite"
 2012: "The Hipsters"
 2012: "The Outsiders"
 2013: "Turn"
 2013: "You'll Know It's Christmas"
 2014: "A New House"
 2016: "The Believers"
 2016: "This is a Love Song"
 2017: "Gone"

References

External links
 Music video list with director names @ mvdbase.com

Deacon Blue
Rock music group discographies